Loxostege angustipennis is a moth in the family Crambidae. It was described by Zerny in 1914. It is found in China (Tian-Shan mountains) and Turkmenistan.

References

Moths described in 1914
Pyraustinae
Taxa named by Hans Zerny